Squander (written as "$QUANDER" on the box and in the rules) is an Avalon Hill board game published in 1965. It is based loosely on the game Monopoly, but in reverse. As in Monopoly, players roll dice and move around a board, encountering opportunities to make financial decisions. The object, however, is to lose money rather than gain it. Each player starts with a million "Squanderbucks" and the winner is the first player to become bankrupt.

External links
 

Avalon Hill games
Board games introduced in 1965